The Fufulso–Sawla Road is a  road constructed by the Government of Ghana linking Fufulso and Sawla through Damongo in the Northern Region of Ghana. It is also called Fufulso-Sawla-Damongo Road. Construction works started in 2012.

References

Roads in Ghana